Saint Fulgentius may refer to:

Fulgentius of Cartagena (fl. 7th century)  Bishop of Cartagena and Ecija (Astigi), in Hispania
Fulgentius of Ruspe  (462 or 467 — 527 or 533), bishop of the city of Ruspe, North Africa